Artom is a Jewish-Italian surname. Notable people with the surname include:

 Benjamin Artom (1835–1879), Italian-born English rabbi
 Emilio Artom (1888–1952), Jewish Italian mathematician
 Isaac Artom (1829 –1900), Jewish Italian writer, diplomat, and politician

See also
 Artem, Russian given name

Jewish surnames
Italian-language surnames